Mexrenoate potassium (developmental code name SC-26714) is a synthetic steroidal antimineralocorticoid which was never marketed.

See also
 Mexrenoic acid
 Mexrenone

References

Abandoned drugs
Antimineralocorticoids
Carboxylic acids
Enones
Potassium compounds
Pregnanes
Spirolactones
Tertiary alcohols